Archie Stewart, nicknamed "Tank", was an American Negro league pitcher in the 1920s.

Stewart played for the St. Louis Stars in 1923. In 26 recorded games on the mound, he posted a 5–6 record with a 5.16 ERA over 118.2 innings.

References

External links
 and Seamheads

Year of birth missing
Year of death missing
Place of birth missing
Place of death missing
St. Louis Stars (baseball) players